The Iranian Journal of Medical Sciences is a bimonthly medical journal established in 1970 as the Pahlavi Medical Journal, obtaining its current name in 1979. The editor-in-chief is Younes Ghasemi.

Abstracting and indexing
The journal is indexed and abstracted in Embase/Excerpta Medica, Emerging Sources Citation Index, and Scopus.

References

External links
 

Publications established in 1970
General medical journals
Bimonthly journals
English-language journals
Academic journals of Iran